Aleksandr Golubev may refer to:
 Aleksandr Titovich Golubev (1936-2020), Soviet and Russian intelligence officer
 Aleksandr Golubev (footballer) (b. 1986), Russian footballer
 Aleksandr Golubev (speed skater) (b. 1972), Russian speed skater